Orenia chitinitropha is a bacterium from the genus of Orenia which has been isolated from anoxic sediments from a hypersaline lake from the Kulunda Steppe.

References

Clostridia
Bacteria described in 2014